Push-to-pass is a mechanism on a race car which provides the driver with the ability to increase the car's power for short periods, usually via a button on the steering wheel. The system is designed to make overtaking easier, and hence make the sport more exciting to watch. The increased power can stem from various mechanisms, for example by changing engine modes or utilizing energy stored in an extra battery. Presently, all racing associations except drag racing ban nitrous oxide for use in boosting of internal combustion engines.

Use 
Several racing series have implemented push-to-pass systems, including the former Champ Car series, the A1GP series (who refer to their system as PowerBoost), Audi Sport TT Cup (since 2015), DTM (since 2019), Indy Lights (since 2015) and the IndyCar Series (who refer to the system as an overtake button).

Formula E 
Formula E features the Fanboost, where fans can vote for their favourite driver via various social media channels to give them an extra power boost at each race. For the 2018–19 season, an Attack Mode was also introduced, where drivers receive a boost by driving through a designated area of the circuit off the racing line. They can then press the attack mode button in a designated attack mode zone to activate the engine boost.

Formula 1 
In Formula One, the kinetic energy recovery system (KERS) functions in a similar manner; however, it relies on regenerative braking to store energy for later use, rather than simply increasing the engine's power, as is the case in some other systems. The drag reduction system (DRS), by contrast, increases acceleration and top speed by moving an element of the rear wing to reduce drag rather than by boosting power; its use in races is more restricted.

Use other than for overtaking 
No requirement limits the system’s use only when attempting to overtake another car. For example, a driver may choose to operate the system to defend a position, or to improve lap time during qualifying or during a race while performing an undercut or overcut. The amount of extra power, the amount of boost time and the number of boost activations available during the race vary from series to series.

References

Auto racing equipment